Thor was a US space launch vehicle derived from the PGM-17 Thor intermediate-range ballistic missile. The Thor rocket was the first member of the Delta rocket family of space launch vehicles.

Launch statistics

Launch outcome

Launch history

References

Lists of Thor launches
Lists of Thor and Delta launches
Lists of rocket launches